Score is the second studio album from the British keyboardist Duncan Mackay, which was released by EMI in 1977.

Background
Score was produced by John Wetton, who also provides vocals on three of the tracks. Four tracks on the album contain lyrics written by Steve Harley and he also provided vocals on "Time Is No Healer". At the time, Mackay was a member of Steve Harley & Cockney Rebel. Other musicians on Score include Clive Chaman on bass and Andrew McCulloch on drums and percussion. The album was recorded and mixed at Scorpio Studios in London in August and September 1976.

Prior to the album's release, EMI denied claims that Mackay would leave Steve Harley & Cockney Rebel if the album was a commercial success. Instead, Mackay intended to continue playing with the band while also pursuing a solo career including performing his own live concerts.

Release
Score received its first release on CD in 2016. It was released in South Africa through Fresh Music and by Marquee in Japan, the latter release being remastered. In 2019, another Japanese CD remaster was released by Belle Antique, which contained the bonus track "Melange".

Critical reception

On its release, Robin Smith of Record Mirror felt the album gave Mackay "the chance to exercise his talents to the full". He stated, "It's symphonic rock at its best, and unlike many offerings it doesn't sound pretentious. [It's] an album of many changing moods – the real Mackay." The US music industry trade magazine Record World commented, "Mackay can now take his rightful place alongside Rick Wakeman, Keith Emerson, Patrick Moraz and Vangelis with this adventurous LP." The reviewer noted Wetton and Harley's vocal contributions on the album, but added "it is Mackay who is in the spotlight with just the right amount of excess to make it work on different levels".

Track listing

Personnel
 Duncan Mackay – keyboards, Yamaha grand piano, Hammond B3, Clavinet D6, Wurlitzer 200, Roland Sequencer, ARP 2600, ARP 2800, ARP 2701, ARP 2100, ARP 2200
 John Wetton – vocals (tracks 3, 7, 9)
 Steve Harley – vocals (track 4)
 Yvonne Keeley – vocal effects
 Clive Chaman – bass, Fender Precision bass
 Andrew McCulloch – drums, percussion
 Mel Collins – flute (track 4)
 Members of the London Symphony Orchestra – orchestra (track 1)
 Wilf Gibson – orchestral arrangement

Production
 John Wetton – producer
 Ray Hendriksen – recording engineer
 Dennis Weinreich – mixing engineer

Other
 Bill Richmond – cover photography
 Fausto Dorelli – cover photography (of Mackay)
 Peter Vernon – inner photography
 Brian Palmer – design

References

1977 albums
EMI Records albums
Albums produced by John Wetton